Computer University (Myeik) is a university in Myeik, Taninthayi Region, Myanmar, offering courses in computer science and information technology.

History
Government Computer College (Myeik),  Government Computer College (Myeik) was opened in the National Solidarity and Development Association Hall in 4 September, 2000. On 20 January 2017, it was promised into University Level. So, it has become Computer University (Myeik). On 15 May 2012, it was transferred into Shwe-du Village. It is a three-storey building and it is situated by the side of the Union of Myeik-Tanin-thar-yi Highway Road.

Bachelor Degree
BCSc (Bachelor of Computer Science)
BCTech (Bachelor of Computer Technology)

References

Technological universities in Myanmar